With What Voice (original title: Com Que Voz) is a 2009 documentary film directed by Nicholas Oulman.

Synopsis
With What Voice is a documentary on life of Alain Oulman, an important cultural figure during the nineteen-sixties and seventies in Portuguese and French society. The film, shot in Lisbon, Paris and Tel Aviv, features Patricia Highsmith, Amos Oz, Amalia Rodrigues and Mário Soares.

See also
 Fado

External links

Com Que Voz in Antena 1
"Com que voz" Entrevista com Nicholas Oulman no C.C. Malaposta 
Com Que Voz in Cinema.pt
Com Que Voz in Expresso
Com Que Voz in Gazeta dos Artistas
Alain Oulman - Com Que Voz in CineCartaz - Público
Com Que Voz in SplitScreen
Award for best first documentary at DocLisboa, Portugal (2009)
 Nicholas Oulman

2009 films
2009 documentary films
Documentary films about music and musicians
Portuguese documentary films
Fado